Puccia is an Italian surname. Notable people with the surname include:

Kyle Puccia, American songwriter, composer, and producer
Matt Puccia, American stock car racing crew chief

Italian-language surnames